Compound NJ2 is a xanthylium yellowish pigment found in wine.

In model solutions, colorless compounds, such as catechin, can give rise to new types of pigments. The first step is the formation of colorless dimeric compounds consisting of two flavanol units linked by carboxy-methine bridge. This is followed by the formation of xanthylium salt yellowish pigments and their ethylesters, resulting from the dehydration of the colorless dimers, followed by an oxidation process. The loss of a water molecule takes place between two A ring hydroxyl groups of the colorless dimers.

See also 
 wine color
 Phenolic content in wine

References 

Polyphenols